Coventry Colliery was a coal mine located in the village of Keresley End in northern Warwickshire, between Bedworth and Coventry, England. Closed in 1991, the site today has been redeveloped as a distribution park, owned by Prologis.

Wykens Collieries
Wyken Collieries Ltd had started to extract coal from coal seams within the Warwickshire Coalfield from 1862, across three mining developments in North Warwickshire:
Wyken Colliery: served by the Oxford Canal, in 1862 the London and North Western Railway built a short connecting mineral railway to its own Coventry to Nuneaton Line. This mine was worked out by 1881
Alexandra Colliery: started at the same time as the Wyken, it was also served from the same LNWR railway. Miners moved to this pit after the closure of the Wyken, but it too became exhausted by 1919
Craven Colliery: started after the other two mines, it also was served by the same LNWR branch

In 1902, the company commenced trial excavations at Keresley north of Coventry, and soon discovered a viable coal seam. The sinking of a new mine was sanctioned by an Act of Parliament, but not started due to economic problems.

Development

On 14 February 1911, the investors in the Wykens Collieries formed the new Warwickshire Coal Company Ltd, to take over the mines of the Wykens company and develop the coal seam at Keresley. The sinking of the shafts of the Coventry Colliery were begun immediately. By 1913, the shafts had reached below the geographical reach of the single  shaft of the Hawkesbury Junction steam engine pump house supplying water to both the Coventry and Oxford Canals. Originally built in 1821, it housed a Newcomen steam engine, which was brought from Griff Colliery, where it had already worked for 100 years. Named Lady Godiva, it was decommissioned in 1913 but left in place, moved to the Dartmouth Museum in the 1960s. This geographic resource meant that the colliery had an immediate outlet for its pumped-out water ingress.

Operations
Originally, the colliery had its own branch from the Coventry Canal, but in 1919 with the return of the men from the First World War, production increased. A separate and new  private railway was constructed from the LNWR's Coventry to Nuneaton Line at Three Spires Junction.

As a result of the mines expansion, the village of Keresley expanded. Modern new houses were built in the new expansion areas of Keresley Newlands and Keresley End, which included the inclusion of inside toilets and good sized gardens. In 1924 the mine company built a Social Club, operated by the Miners' Federation of Great Britain. The club closed in May 2012, after losses mounted to £500 per day.

In 1924 all shares in Warwickshire Coal Co Ltd were acquired by the Coltness Iron Company (CIC) Ltd. With the closure due to complete workout in 1927 of the Craven Colliery, all miners were transferred to the Coventry Colliery. With significant contracts to supply coal to electricity generation stations in Birmingham and Coventry, including the Hams Hall power stations, the company hired in over 1,000 coal wagons.

Nationalised on 1 January 1947, the colliery became part of the National Coal Board's (NCB) Area 4 (Warwickshire). In the early 1960s, the NCB started a development of a smokeless coal plant, known as a Homefire Plant, on site. This came into production in 1967, and resultantly in an NCB reorganisation the Coventry Colliery became part of the South Midlands Area (SMD).

Somewhat unusually for a colliery in the Midlands, there was substantial support for the UK miners' strike (1984–85), and it had a majority of the workforce on strike for a large part of the dispute.

The colliery closed for redevelopment in October 1991, with the site handed over to the local authority in 1996. The Homefire Plant closed in 2000.

Transport
Originally, the colliery had its own branch from the Coventry Canal.

But the large amounts of spoil created, and the reduction in shipping charges associated with building materials, necessitated the building of a temporary  private railway, which connected with the LNWR's Coventry to Nuneaton Line at Three Spires Junction near Foleshill. In 1919, with the return of the men from the First World War, production increased. The line was hence rebuilt as double track with extensive sidings adjacent to Three Spires Junction, and formally used for the distribution of extracted coal.
 
The company bought its own locomotives to operate these private lines, bought new and secondhand from a range of manufacturers, including Andrew Barclay Sons & Co., North British Locomotive and Peckett and Sons.

In the early 1960s, with the Beeching Axe making ex-British Railways (BR) steam engine types cheaply available, the NCB bought three ex-Great Western Railway 1500 Class 0-6-0 Pannier Tanks in 1962, No.s 1501, 1502 and 1509. All three were sent to Andrew Barclay Sons & Co. in Scotland for refurbishment before use on the colliery system, and their being brought into operation resulted in all of the other existing standard gauge locomotives being scrapped onsite.

In 1970, the NCB contracted in British Rail Class 08 diesel shunters. The three 1500 Class locomotives were sold into preservation at the Severn Valley Railway, with 1502 and 1509 providing a kit of spares to refurbish 1501, before they were scrapped at Cashmore's, Great Bridge in October 1970. 1501's boiler certificate expired in 2006, and is currently undergoing overhaul on the SVR.

Locomotives
The colliery company/NCB owned and operated locomotives were:

Prologis Park, Coventry

After British Coal handed the site over to the local authority in 1996, the site was divided into three areas:
The residual Homefire "smokeless coal" plant
A country park, called Keresley Park. This also houses the new Keresley Community Centre opened in 1999
A new distribution park, owned by Prologis

After the closure of the Homefire plant in 2000, that area was also redeveloped as part of the distribution park. Retaining its connection to the national rail network via Network Rail, the site also has road connections to the M6 motorway.

In 2008, a memorial was erected to the former miners of the colliery and workers at the smokeless fuel plant.

The link road off Wheelwright Lane, which commences next to the level crossing, is named Winding House Lane.

See also
 Daw Mill
 Dexter Colliery

References

External links
Coventry Colliery @ Mine-Explorer.co.uk

History of Coventry
Coal mines in Warwickshire
Underground mines in England
History of Warwickshire
1911 establishments in England
1991 disestablishments in England